Gowri is a 2004 Indian Telugu-language action film directed by  B. V. Ramana. It stars Sumanth and Charmme Kaur in the lead roles, and was produced by Sravanthi Ravi Kishore. It is a remake of the 2003 Tamil film Thirumalai, starring Vijay and Jyothika. The film was later dubbed into Hindi under the title The Gunda.

Plot 
Gowri is an orphan and a motorcycle mechanic living in Dhoolpet, Hyderabad. Shweta is the daughter of a media moghul Chandra Shekhar. Gowri and Shweta fall in love with each other to the disapproval of Chandra Shekhar, who seeks the help of a mafia leader Sarkar to separate them. Gowri eventually overcomes Sarkar and convinces Chandra Shekhar to accept him.

Cast

Sumanth as Gowri Shankar
Charmy Kaur as Shweta
Atul Kulkarni as Sarkar
Vizag Prasad as Chandra Shekhar
Jyoti as Chitra
Pavala Shyamala as Chitra's paternal aunt
Naresh as Raghu
Kousalya as Nagalakshmi
Sharwanand as Krishna, Gowri Shankar's friend 
Narra Venkateswara Rao as former Home Minister
Ahuti Prasad
Tanikella Bharani
Chalapathi Rao as current Home Minister
Venu Madhav as Interviewee
Srinivasa Reddy as Gowri Shankar's friend
Banerjee
Chitram Seenu as Gowri Shankar's friend
Peter Hein as Stunt artist
Raghu Babu as Sarkar's henchman

Soundtrack
The music was composed by Koti and released by Aditya Music. All lyrics were penned by Sirivennela Seetharama Sastry.

References

External links

2000s Telugu-language films
Telugu remakes of Tamil films
2004 films
Films scored by Koti